Free state is a term occasionally used in the official titles of some states throughout the world with varying meanings depending on the context. In principle, the title asserts and emphasises a particular freedom of the state in question, but this is not always reflected in practice. Some states use the title to assert sovereignty or independence from foreign domination, while others have used it to assert autonomy within a larger nation-state. Sometimes "free state" is used as a synonym for "republic".

The republican sense of the term derives from libera res publica (literally, "the free public thing/affair"), a term used by Latin historians for the period of the Roman Republic, though not all "free states" have been republics. The historical German free states and the Orange Free State of Southern Africa were republican in form, however the Congo Free State and Irish Free State were governed under forms of monarchy.

Overview

Republican England
English Parliament, in the act forming the Commonwealth of England of 1649 to 1660, declared that "England is confirmed to be a Commonwealth and Free State and shall from henceforth be Governed as a Commonwealth and Free State." The Commonwealth had a republican constitution.

Germany

In Germany, the term free state (in German, Freistaat) comes from the 19th century as a German word for republic. After the German Revolution of November 1918, when Imperial Germany became a democratic republic, most of the German states within the German Reich called themselves a Free State. Others used expressions like Republik or Volksstaat (people's state) – though unpopular, as that term was associated with the enemy France. According to the Versailles Treaty, Danzig was split off from Germany in 1919, becoming the Free City of Danzig.

After the Nazis came to power, they abolished the concept of a federal republic and all the states and re-organized Germany into Gaue, with appointed leadership.

The states were re-established within the reduced German borders after World War II; however, from 1952 only Bavaria (successor (but not de jure) to the Kingdom of Bavaria) still called itself a Free State and that made Freistaat a synonym for Bavaria. After the reunification, the reestablished Saxony (successor (but not de jure) to the Kingdom of Saxony) used the name again in 1992 and Thuringia began to use it for the first time in 1993.

Free Cities
Historically, Germany had Imperial Free Cities, who were subject only to the Emperor of the Holy Roman Empire. In 1871 Germany knew three Free Cities, Hamburg, Bremen and Lübeck; the last lost its status in 1937. Since 1949, the Federal Republic of Germany has Hamburg (Freie und Hansestadt, Free and Hanseatic City) and Bremen (Freie Hansestadt), as well as Berlin, as a city which is also a state. Like the Free States these three cities have no special rights in the federation.

Africa

In South Africa, the term free state was used in the title of the nineteenth century Orange Free State (Oranje Vrystaat in Afrikaans) and is today used in the title of its successor, Free State; both entities were established as republican in form.

In contrast, the Congo Free State came into being between 1877 and 1884 as a private kingdom or dictatorship of King Leopold II of Belgium. In this case, the term free emphasised the new state's freedom from major colonial powers and the Belgian parliament, as the colony was ruled only by the king.

Irish Free State

The Irish Free State of 1922–1937 was a form of constitutional monarchy under the British monarch. The term free state was deliberately chosen as a literal translation of the Irish word saorstát. At the time in which Irish nationalists (who generally favoured a republican form of state) were negotiating the secession of most of Ireland from the United Kingdom, the word saorstát was a commonly used Irish-language word for republic. The British did not wish to permit the creation of an Irish republic (which would mean severing all links with the British crown) and so insisted that the literal translation of saorstát be used in the new state's English title instead. The term saorstát thus represented a compromise in terminology: constitutional monarchists could accept it as a less explicit rejection of the monarchy than the term republic itself, while republicans could choose to interpret it as signifying a republic by any other name.

Puerto Rico

The official Spanish name of the Commonwealth of Puerto Rico is Estado Libre Asociado de Puerto Rico, literally, "Associated Free State of Puerto Rico", expressing a "politically organized community” or “State,” which is simultaneously connected by a compact to a larger political system and hence does not have an independent and separate status. However, according to the United States Supreme Court, Puerto Rico is not free or associated; it is only a state in the general sense, not as a state of the Union in the U.S. constitutional sense. According to consistent U.S. Supreme Court jurisprudence, Puerto Rico belongs to but is not an integral part (Organized incorporated territory) of the United States. Moreover, the said jurisprudence has determined that regardless of what nominal or cosmetic veneer has moted Puerto Rico's political status, it is essentially a U.S. colonial territory, since it is under the plenary powers of the U.S. Congress. At its most basic, this Supreme Court doctrine expresses that Puerto Rico is more like property, far from a free-governing community or nation, and thus "domestic in a foreign sense" (not for the taking or meddling by free foreign nations), but "foreign in a domestic sense" (not a partner or an equal). In the Insular Cases, the Court ruled that the United States Constitution does not automatically apply in Puerto Rico.

List of 'free states'

Contemporary

 Free State of Bavaria
 Free State of Saxony
 Free State of Thuringia
 Free State, South Africa
 Estado Libre Asociado de Puerto Rico

Historical
 Commonwealth of England (1649–1660)
 Free State of Costa Rica (1838–1847)
 Orange Free State (1854–1900)
 Free State of Jones (1863–1865)
 Congo Free State (1884–1908)
 Klein Vrystaat "Little Free State" (1886–1891)
 Free State of Icaria (1912)
 Free State of Fiume (1920–1924)
 Kamchatka Free State (1921–1922)
 Chukotka Free State (1922–1923)
 Irish Free State (1922–1937)
 Free Territory of Trieste (1947–1954)
 Free Lebanon State (1979-1984)

Germany
 Free State of Coburg (1918–1920)
 Free State of Bottleneck (1919–1923)
 Free State of Waldeck-Pyrmont (1918–1929)
 Free State of Mecklenburg-Schwerin (1918–1933)
 Free State of Mecklenburg-Strelitz (1918–1933)
 Free State of Anhalt (1918–1945)
 Free State of Brunswick (1918–1945)
 People's State of Hesse (1918–1945)
 Free State of Oldenburg (1918–1946)
 Free State of Schaumburg-Lippe (1918–1945)
 Free State of Lippe (1918–1947)
 Free State of Prussia (1920–1947)
 Free People's State of Württemberg (1918–1945)
 Free Republic of Schwarzenberg (May–June 1945)
 Freistaat Baden (1945–1952; called  "South Baden" until 1947)

See also
Free city (disambiguation)
Freetown
List of former sovereign states

References

Former countries
Country name etymology
Types of countries